On 4 June 2018, N. Ravikumar  was elected unopposed to the Karnataka Legislative Council. Out of 11 seats, the INC won 4 seats, JD(S) 2 and BJP 5. A full time worker of ABVP (Akila Bharathiya Vidyarthi Parishad) from his college days, he has been instrumental in many student related policies.

References

Living people
Bharatiya Janata Party politicians from Karnataka
Year of birth missing (living people)